Rise and Shine Pilipinas  is a Philippine morning newscast showcasing the latest news, inspiring features and up-to-date information to jumpstart the morning. Hosted by PTV newscasters Diane Querrer and Audrey Gorriceta, and youth leader Gab Bayan, Rise and Shine Pilipinas is produced and aired on PTV, which was aired from September 7, 2020 to present, replacing Bagong Pilipinas and Daily Info.  The program airs daily from Monday to Friday at 6:30 am to 8:30 am (PST) on PTV and its livestreaming channels with Simulcast on IBC.

History 
It was launched on September 7, 2020 (following the reformat of PTV's news programming grid), replacing Bagong Pilipinas and Daily Info, which lasted for 3 years.

Since April 5, 2021, Bendijo were on self-quarantine, Given this Gani Oro serves as the Weekday Co-Anchor along with Querrer & Bayan, due to the reimposed enhanced community quarantine caused by the surge of COVID-19 cases in the Greater Manila Area as well as a full bed capacity in different Hospitals that started in March 2021.

Hosts
Current
Diane Querrer (2020–present)
Gab Bayan (2020-2021, 2022–present)
Audrey Gorriceta (2022–present)
Former
Aljo Bendijo (2020–2022)
Gani Oro (2021, 2022)
Joee Guilas (2021–2022)
Meiji Cruz (2021–2022)

Segment Hosts 
Current:
Alfonso "Fifi" Delos Santos (Chika on the Road)
Edmund Rosales (PTV InfoWeather) (November 16, 2020–present)
Chi Atienza-Valdepenas (The Good Juan)
Tricia Bersano (RSP Weekly Top Picks)
Dianne Medina-Illustre (TalkBiz)
Former:
Karla Paderna (Sarap Pinoy) (2020-2022)
Louisa Erispe (Bantay Presyo)
Trixie Jaafar-Tiu (PTV InfoWeather) (September 7 – November 6, 2020)
Hanz Chua (Horrorscope)
Emman Franc (School TV) (2020)
Reporters:
 Alvin Barcelona (from Inquirer 990 Television - General Assignments)
 Bea Bernardo (AFP/PNP)
 Louisa Erispe (General Assignments)
 Mark Fetalco (City of Manila)
 Allan Francisco (from DWIZ PTV Senior Correspondent - City of Manila)
 Dexter Ganibe (from TeleRadyo - General Assignments)
 Joshua Garcia (from Golden Nation Network - General Assignments)
 Gillian Geronimo (from Golden Nation Network - General Assignments)
 Deo De Guzman (from RMN 558 Manila - General Assignments)
 Catleya Jardenil-Antonio (General Assignments)
 Bernard Jaudian Jr. (Police Beat)
 Patrick De Jesus (General Assignments/NCRPO)
 Mica Ella Joson (Southern Metro/MMDA)
 Rod Lagusad (from Inquirer 990 Television - General Assignments)
 Ryan Lesigues (from 104.7 Brigada News FM National - General Assignments)
 Mela Lesmoras (Malacañang)
 Maan Macapagal (from ABS-CBN - General Assignments)
 Den Macaranas (from Inquirer 990 Television - General Assignments)
 Daniel Manalastas (from News Light - House of Representatives)
 Kenneth Paciente (PTV Senior Correspondent - Judiciary) 
 Cleizl Pardilla (Quezon City) 
 Sandra Samala (General Assignments)
 Eunice Samonte (PTV Senior Correspondent - Senate)
 Stephanie Sevillano (General Assignments)
 Noel Talacay (from RMN 558 Manila - General Assignments)
 Naomi Tiburcio (General Assignments/Foreign Affairs)
 Sweeden Velado-Ramirez (PTV Senior Correspondent)
 Karen Villanda (from  CLTV 36 - General Assignments)
 Cecille Villarosa (from DZBB - General Assignments)

Segments
Current
Headlines
Police Report (Police Report)
Balitang ASEAN (ASEAN News)
Balitang Abroad (World News)
Chika on the Road (Traffic Update)
PTV InfoWeather (Weather Forecast)
Bantay Presyo (Market Price Watch)
Government at Work (since 2021)
PTV Sports (Sports News)
TalkBiz (Entertainment News)
Trip Ko 'To (Travelogue Segment) (since 2022)
The Good Juan (Inspiring Stories)
TrabaHunting Job Opening)
Excess Baggage: The OFW Stories (OFW Story)
Patok sa Bayan (Feature) (since 2022)
RSP Weekly Top Picks (Weekly Top 5 Countdown)
Wednesday Pet Day (Pet Features)
Sarap Pinoy (Cooking Segment)
Jamming (Live Performances)
Fit Na Fit Friday (Fitness Segment)
Former
Salot na Droga (2020-2022)
Pamana
Kaya Natin To
Kuha Mo, I-Report Mo!
You Normal
Tara Na
Game Zone
Horrorscope
Start Up
My DIY
Tue-Torial
Mensahe ng Pasko

See also
List of programs broadcast by People's Television Network

References

People's Television Network original programming
Breakfast television in the Philippines
2020 Philippine television series debuts
2020s Philippine television series
Philippine television news shows
Filipino-language television shows
Sign language television shows